Adoni is a city in Andhra Pradesh, India.

Adoni may also refer to:

Religion 
 Adon from Hebrew Adoni can be translated as "my lord"
  for Adonai, the name of God 
 Adonis, a central figure in various mystery religions

Places 
 Adoni (Bihor), village in Tarcea Commune, Bihor County, Romania
 Adoni (Assembly constituency)
 Adoni Municipality
 Adoni revenue division
 Nuraghe Adoni

Given names 
 Adoni Maropis (born 1963), American actor

See also 
 Adonis (disambiguation)
 Adony (disambiguation)